Cobb River may refer to:

Cobb River, New Zealand
Cobb River (Minnesota), United States